Staples Pond is located in the town of Temple, Maine, in the United States.  Some locals prefer to call it "Santa Claus Lake", because of its appearance from the air.  Water from Staples Pond flows via Temple Stream to the Sandy River in Farmington, and thence to the Kennebec River.

References

External links 

Lakes of Franklin County, Maine
Reservoirs in Maine